British Virgin Islands participated at the 2018 Summer Youth Olympics in Buenos Aires, Argentina from 6 October to 18 October 2018.

Athletics

British Virgin Islands qualified 2 athletes.

Swimming

British Virgin Islands qualified 1 athlete.

References

2018 in British Virgin Islands sport
Nations at the 2018 Summer Youth Olympics
British Virgin Islands at the Youth Olympics